was one of Minamoto no Yoshinaka's fortresses in Echizen Province, Japan. In April and May 1183, a Taira force led by Taira no Koremori attacked the fortress.
 
It was built on rocky crags, and well-defended; the Minamoto had even built a dam to create a moat. However, a traitor within the fortress tied a message to an arrow, firing it into the Taira camp, and revealing a way to breach the dam and drain the water. The castle soon fell to the Taira, but Yoshinaka and much of his forces survived and escaped.

References

1180s in Japan
1183 in Asia
Hiuchi 1183
Hiuchi 1183
Conflicts in 1183